Herbert Compton may refer to:

 Herbert Eastwick Compton (1853–1906), English novelist, biographer, and world traveller
 Herbert Abingdon Draper Compton (1770–1846), British India judge